Giorgos "George" Kollias (born August 30, 1977) is a Greek heavy metal drummer and music teacher best known for his work with American technical death metal band Nile. He is the first Nile drummer to perform every song on more than one full-length album (handling drum duties so far on all albums from Annihilation of the Wicked through Vile Nilotic Rites). His sponsors include Zildjian cymbals, Evans, Vic Firth, and Axis Pedals; the last with whom he released his signature bass drum pedals. In addition to being the drummer of Nile, he also teaches drums at the Modern Music School in Athens.

Biography
Kollias was born in Corinth. He started playing drums, self-taught, at the age of 12, covering songs of his favorite bands like Sepultura and Slayer. Around 1999, he started drum lessons with Greek drummer Yannis Stavropoulos, who was a big influence on Kollias.

His early inspirations include Lars Ulrich, Richard Christy, Paul Bostaph, Pete Sandoval, Dave Lombardo, Igor Cavalera, Gene Hoglan. Later his taste expanded to different drummers like Vinnie Colaiuta, Dave Weckl, Steve Gadd, Thomas Lang, and Mike Mangini.

He previously drummed for Sickening Horror, a death metal band. He also used to be in the Greek melodic death metal band Nightfall but left the band in 2005 to join Nile.

Kollias made an instructional drumming DVD called Intense Metal Drumming that was released in July 2008.

He has a brother named Iraklis Kollias, who was the guitarist for the band Extremity Obsession.

Technique
Kollias uses a foot technique in between heel up and heel down. His heels remain close to the bases of the pedals, but only his toes and the balls of his feet actually touch the pedal board. All the weight of his legs fall on the balls of his feet. When playing at slower bpms, Kollias's legs do the vast majority of the movement of a kick, moving up and down as much as the pedal does itself. However, as his speed increases, the heels of his feet move less and less, until the bpm is high enough that all the movement of the pedals stems from his ankles. Once he gets up to speeds that are this fast, he employs a swivel technique. In this technique, he uses his feet to keep count of the beats he has hit, moving his ankles to the right side of the pedal and then swinging them over to the other side of the pedal. In this way, as he explains, the extra energy that one's legs waste when they work so hard is utilized.

Kollias's hand technique gives him great precision as well, though it is not nearly as individualistic as his foot technique. Kollias grips the stick fully with his index through his ring finger, letting them stretch forward and wrap around the stick. He does not use his thumb and index finger to create a swivel. Instead, all of his speed stems from his wrists, much like his ankle usage in the kick.

Discography

With Nile

 Annihilation of the Wicked (2005)
 Ithyphallic (2007)
 Those Whom the Gods Detest (2009)
 At the Gate of Sethu (2012)
 What Should Not Be Unearthed (2015)
 Vile Nilotic Rites (2019)

With Cerebrum
 Spectral Extravagance (2009)
 Cosmic Enigma (2013)

With Sickening Horror
 When Landscapes Bled Backwards (2007)

With Nightfall
 I Am Jesus (2003)
 Lyssa: Rural Gods and Astonishing Punishments (2004)

With Extremity Obsession
 Extremity Obsession (Demo, 1996)
 Everlasting (Demo, 1997)

With Deus Infestus
 Swansongs For This Stillborn Race (2010)

Personal releases
 Intense Metal Drumming DVD (DVD, 2008)
 Intense Metal Drumming II DVD (DVD, 2012)
 Invictus (LP, 2015)

With ADE
 Spartacus (2013)

With Týr
 Valkyrja (2013)

With Contrarian
 Predestined (2014)
 Polemic (2015)
 To Perceive Is To Suffer (2017)
 Their Worm Never Dies (2019)

With Demonstealer
 This Burden Is Mine (2016)

With Black Water Sunset
 Engraved Spectral Aeons (2023)

References

External links
Official site

Death metal musicians
1977 births
Living people
People from Corinth
Greek heavy metal guitarists
Greek drummers
Greek bass guitarists
Season of Mist artists
21st-century drummers
21st-century bass guitarists